The women's hammer throw event at the 2006 African Championships in Athletics was held at the Stade Germain Comarmond on August 9.

Results

Note: Hayat El Ghazi who originally won the silver was later disqualified for doping.

References
Results 
Results

2006 African Championships in Athletics
Hammer throw at the African Championships in Athletics
2006 in women's athletics